{{Infobox chef
| honorific_prefix =
| name           = Scott Conant
| honorific_suffix =
| image          = 
| image_size     = 
| alt            = 
| caption        = 
| birth_name     =
| birth_date     = 
| birth_place    = Waterbury, Connecticut, U.S.
| death_date     = 
| death_place    = 
| death_cause    = 
| education      = Culinary Institute of America
| spouse         = 
| children       = 2
| style          = Italian
| ratings        = 
| restaurants    = 
| prevrests      = 
| television     = 
| awards         = {{plainlist|
 James Beard Foundation's "Best New Restaurant" for L'Impero, 2003
 Food & Wine Magazines "Best New Chef," 2004
}}
| website        = 
| module         = 
}}Scott Conant' (born February 19, 1971) is an American celebrity chef, restaurateur, and cookbook author. Since 2009, Conant has been a judge on the reality cooking television series Chopped. He has published four cookbooks.

Early life
Conant was born in Waterbury, Connecticut. He is the son of Charles and Anne ( Varrone) Conant. He is of Italian descent on his mother's side. He began cooking at a young age, taking cooking classes at the local community college at age 11. At 15, he enrolled in W.F. Kaynor Technical High School for culinary arts, and then attended the Culinary Institute of America (CIA).

Professional career
While at the Culinary Institute of America, Conant interned at the famous New York City restaurant San Domenico, an experience that had a decisive impact on the young chef. After graduation, he spent a year in Munich, Germany, mastering the art of pastry at the Hotel Bayerischer Hof. He returned to the United States and San Domenico, working as a sous chef. In 1995, Cesare Casella selected him to be chef de cuisine at Il Toscanaccio, an Upper East Side Tuscan-style restaurant. He later became executive chef at City Eatery, located on the Bowery in New York City.

In September 2002, Conant opened L'Impero in Tudor City. Within weeks, the restaurant received a rave three-star review from The New York Times, which stated, "[Conant is] turning out dishes full of flavors that are joyous and highly refined. From the simplest preparations to the most complex, he is almost always in control and in tune." Conant's signature pastas appeared on the cover of Food & Wine, and the magazine went on to name Conant one of America's "Best New Chefs" in 2004.

L'Impero received top honors from the James Beard Foundation in 2003, including “Best New Restaurant” in the U.S. and “Outstanding Restaurant Design.”

In October 2003, Conant was featured on the cover of Gourmet for its “Chefs Rock” issue, and in March 2004, Gourmet editor Ruth Reichl named L'Impero one of her favorite New York restaurants. Following L'Impero, Conant went on to open Alto, a "sophisticated" Italian restaurant in midtown Manhattan that offered his interpretation of Northern Italian cuisine.

Conant left L'Impero and Alto in 2007 and, in 2008, opened Scarpetta in Chelsea, Manhattan. In July 2008, the restaurant garnered a positive three-star review from The New York Times and New York Magazine.

Conant went on to build the Scarpetta brand to national acclaim with restaurants in New York City, Miami, Toronto, Los Angeles, and Las Vegas and published The Scarpetta Cookbook, inspired by dishes from the restaurant.

In July 2010, the reality food-competition television show 24 Hour Restaurant Battle premiered on the Food Network, starring Conant as the host and head judge. The television show pits two teams of two people against each other as they open up a restaurant from scratch in 24 hours. The show ran two seasons. 

In 2021, Conant released his fourth cookbook, Peace, Love, and Pasta: Simple and Elegant Recipes from a Chef's Home Kitchen.

Personal life
Conant has been married to his wife, Meltem (née Bozkurt) since 2007. The couple has two daughters.

Filmography

Awards
 Three Stars from The New York Times for "L'Impero" and "Scarpetta New York"
 Four Stars from Miami Herald for "Scarpetta Miami"
 "Best New Restaurant of 2003" from the James Beard Foundation for "L'Impero"
 "Best New Chef" from Food & Wine Magazine in 2004
 Winner of Season 3 of "Chopped All-Stars"

Cookbooks
 Scott Conant's New Italian Cooking (2005), 
 Bold Italian (2008), 
 The Scarpetta Cookbook (2013), 
 Peace, Love, & Pasta'' (2021),

References

External links
 
 
 
 

1971 births
American male chefs
American television chefs
American writers of Italian descent
Culinary Institute of America Hyde Park alumni
Food Network chefs
Living people
Writers from Waterbury, Connecticut
Writers from New York City
American cookbook writers
American restaurateurs
21st-century American non-fiction writers

ja:マリオ・バターリ